William Robinson ( 1668 – 15 November 1717), of Gwersyllt, Denbighshire, was a Welsh politician.

He sat in the Parliament of England as the Member of Parliament (MP) for Denbigh Boroughs from 1705 to 1708.

References

1660s births
1717 deaths
People from Wrexham
Members of the Parliament of Great Britain for Welsh constituencies
Members of the Parliament of England (pre-1707) for constituencies in Wales
English MPs 1705–1707
British MPs 1707–1708